Il Collegio is a popular Italian historical reality show that has aired on Rai 2 since 2017.

In the first three seasons the show is narrated by Giancarlo Magalli. In the fourth season it is narrated by Eric Alexander and Simona Ventura. The series is based on the format of the British Channel 4 series That'll Teach 'Em.

The helpers of the filming are Sofia Nirie (for the 1st, 2nd, 3rd, and 4th edition), and Seungmin Jung (for the 5th and 6th edition).

Concept 
Several teenagers between the ages of 13 and 17 have to study for a month in a boarding school where the curriculum is based on education between the 1960s and the 1980s. The students must follow a strict dress code and give up their phones and electronics during the month, and inappropriate haircuts, any kind of piercings and foul language are all forbidden. Students may be put in isolation or expelled if they do not follow these rules.

Student dormitories are separated by gender. Classes are given in Italian, Latin, history, geography, mathematics, biology, a foreign language (French in the second season, English in the third, fourth, fifth and sixth), civics and art. Elective classes are physical education, choral music and singing, music education, dance, aerobics, and computer science. At the end of the month the students are required to take an exam (written and oral). If they pass they are presented with a diploma suited to the period that season is set in.

The first season was set in 1960, year of the Olympic Games in Rome and broadcast from 2 to 23 January 2017.

The series was renewed for a second season set in 1961 (the 100th anniversary of the Unification of Italy), and was broadcast from 26 September to 17 October 2017. This season introduced the figure of the class representative (one for boys and one for girls), and the addition of French as a foreign language.

The third season, set in 1968, was broadcast from 12 February 2019 to 12 March for a total of five episodes.  In this season English replaced French as a foreign language, Civics replaced Latin, Art and Music education was added. In the summer following the third season, Clementoni released a board dedicated to the program.

The fourth season is set in 1982, the year in which Italy won the FIFA World Cup, and aired from 22 October 2019 to 26 November 2019 for six episodes, featuring computer science, aerobics and breakdancing as non-exam activities.

The fifth season, which was set in 1992, aired from 27 October 2020 to 15 December 2020. In this edition, the school where the show has been registered is the Convitto Nazionale Regina Margherita in Anagni in the Province of Frosinone, due to heavy COVID-19 pandemic spread in Lombardy. 1992 has been one of the darkest years of Italian history, due to the killings of judges Giovanni Falcone and Paolo Borsellino by the Sicilian Mafia; and the political corruption scandal known as Tangentopoli (Bribesville) for which there was the consequent national judicial investigation known as Mani pulite (Clean Hands), which discovered various instances of corruption and briberies within the Italian politics. This scandal caused the dissolving of the Christian Democray party, that, together with the previous dissolution of the Italian Communist Party in 1991 caused by the dissolution of the Soviet Union in the same year and consequent disillusionment with Communism in some Italian communist politicians, especially the then Secretary of the Party Achille Occhetto, caused by this and the previous fall during the previous years of the others communist governments in Eastern Europe, in turn was one of the major causes which brought to the creation of the Second Italian Republic in two years.

The sixth season is set in 1977, the year in which RAI started to broadcast programs in color for the first time. It aired from 26 October 2021 to 14 December 2021.

The seventh season is set in 1958, a year in which students in Italy were still separated in lower secondary education according to the fact if they wanted to, after completing the middle school to continue to study in high school or not. This was the first seaons in which there weren't entrance exams and in which class representatives weren't elected. It aired from 18 October 2022 to 29 November 2022.

Production
The school the series takes place in is the Collegio San Carlo di Celana, a suburb of Caprino Bergamasco. The fifth edition takes place in Anagni at the Convitto Nazionale Regina Margherita, and so does the sixth edition.

Seasons

Cast

Season 1 - Collegio 1960

Teachers

Paolo Bosisio (Headmaster)
Andrea Maggi (Italian Language and Literature; Latin Language)
Annalisa Ciampalini (Mathematics)
Piera Condotti (Science)
Emilia Termignoni (History and Geography)
Fabio Cacioppoli (Physical Education and Technical Education (Males))
Marco La Rosa (Dance and Ballet)
Maestro Matteo Valbusa (Musical Education)

Guardians

Lucia Gravante (Technical Education teacher (Females) as well)
Luigi Ferrante

Students (year of birth and place of residence)

Swami Caputo (2000, Florence)
Giovanni Petrigliano (2000, Matera)
Carla Addonisio (2000, Macerata Campania (CE))
Filippo Moras (1999, Castelnuovo Scrivia (AL))
Silvia di Santo (2001, Turin)
Ludovica Olgiati (2002, Parabiago (MI))
Pietro Dell'Aquila (2002, Villaricca (NA))
Filippo Zamparini (2002, Varese)
Alessio Milanesi (2001, Bari)
Veronica Mastro (2000, Rome)
Marika Ferrarelle (2000, Naples)
Jenny de Nucci (2000, Limbiate (MB))
Federico Nobile (2002, Florence)
Adriano Occulto (2000, Brebbia (VA))
Arianna Pasin (2001, Merate (LC))
Dimitri Iannone (1999, Villa Literno (CE))
Davide Erba (2001, Monza)
Letizia del Signore (2002, Viterbo).

The following students withdrew from the programme:

Arianna Pasin (Third Episode)
Davide Erba (Second Episode)
Letizia del Signore (First Episode)

The following students were expelled:

Dimitri Iannone (Third Episode) - expelled for insubordination

The following students failed their exams: 

Adriano Occulto (not admitted to the oral exams)
Federico Nobile
Jenny de Nucci

Season 2 - Collegio 1961

Teachers

Alberto Faverio (Headmaster)
Andrea Maggi (Italian Language and Literature; Latin Language)
Mariarosa Petolicchio (Mathematics and Science)
Luca Raina (History and Geography)
Berta Corvi (French Language)
Fabio Cacioppoli (Physical Education and Technical Education (Males))
Maestro Massimo Fiocchi Malaspina (Musical Education)
Marco Larosa (Dance and Ballet)
David Wayne Callahan (English)

Guardians

Luigi Ferrante
Lucia Gravante (Technical Education teacher (Females) as well)

Students

Maddalena Sarti (2001, Molinella (BO))
Edoardo Maragno (2000, Spino d'Adda (CR))
Nagga Baldina (2003, Garbagna Novarese (NO))
Brunella Cacciuni (2002, Torre del Greco (NA))
Gabrielle Paul Sarmiento (2000, Rome)
Michelle Cavallaro (2003, Azzano Decimo (PN))
Elisabetta Gibilisco (2002, Floridia (SR))
Ginevra Mandolese (2002, San Nicolò a Tordino (TE))
Davide Moccia (2002, Casaluce (CE))
Federico Mancosu (2000, Vimodrone (MI))
Noa Planas (2002, Gabicce Mare (PU))
Giuseppe Spitaleri (2000, Palermo)
Gaia Malgeri (2001, Villanova d'Asti (AT)
Dimitri Tincano (2001, Terni)
Arianna Triassi (2001, Naples)
Marco Biò (2000, Milan)
Roberto Magro (2003, Monza)
Camilla Ricciardi (2003, Genoa)

The following students withdrew from the programme:

Marco Biò (Third Episode)
Camilla Maria Ricciardi (Second Episode)

The following students have been expelled:

Roberto Magro (Third Episode) - after being excessively punished and being the worst student in terms of results, he was given a special examination. He failed it, hence he was expelled
Arianna Triassi (Fourth Episode) - expelled for continuous misbehaving

Season 3 - Collegio 1968

Teachers

Paolo Bosisio (Headmaster)
Andrea Maggi (Italian Language and Civic Education)
Mariarosa Petolicchio (Mathematics and Science)
David Wayne Callahan (English Language)
Diana Cavagnaro (Musical Education)
Luca Raina (History and Geography)
Dario Cipani (Physical Education)
Marco Larosa (Dance and Ballet)
Alessandro Carnevale (Artistic Education)

Guardians and Technical Education Teachers

Piero Maggiò (Males)
Lucia Gravante (Females)

Students 

Beatrice Cossu (2001, Bareggio (MI))
Riccardo Tosi (2001, Verona)
Noemi Ortona (2003, Milan)
Elia Libero Gumiero (2004, Campolongo Maggiore (VE))
William Carrozzo (2001, Galliate (NO))
Youssef Komeiha (2002, Naples)
Gabriele de Chiara (2001, Rome)
Alice Carbotti (2003, San Donato Milanese (MI))
Giulia Mannucci (2002, Rome)
Jennifer Poni (2001, Ranica (BG))
Nicole Rossi (2001, Rome)
Esteban Frigerio (2003, Como)
Alice de Bortoli (2003, Casale sul Sile (TV))
Matias Caviglia (2003, Massalengo (LO))
Luca Cobelli  (2001, Settimo Milanese (MI))
Cora Fazzini (2002, Città Sant'Angelo (PE))
Marilù Fazzini (2002, Città Sant'Angelo (PE))
Michael Gambuzza (2002, Milan)
Evan Nestola (2002, Milan)
Ginevra Pirola (2002, Bollate (MI))
Syria d'Ambra (2003,Milan)
Luca Vitozzi (2001, Forlì)

The following students withdrew from the programme:

Ginevra Pirola (Second Episode)

The following students were expelled: 

Cora and Marilù Fazzini (Fifth Episode) - Cora Fazzini was sent to the principal's office after using a derogatory term to Professor Raina and was expelled due to her continuous bad behaviour. Marilù, for defending her sister, was also expelled. 
Michael Gambuzza (Third Episode) - he raised his voice to Professor Petolicchio and was expelled.
Evan Nestola (Third Episode) - he was expelled for cutting his hair, tarnishing the college's image.

The following students failed at the final exam:

Luca Cobelli  - he was not admitted to the oral exams
Matias Caviglia

The following students entered at the second episode:

Luca Cobelli 
Alice de Bortoli

The following students were not admitted after failing the entry test:

Luca Vitozzi
Syria d'Ambra

Fourth Season - Collegio 1982

Teachers 

Paolo Bosisio (Headmaster)
Andrea Maggi (Italian Language and Literature; Civic Education)
Mariarosa Petolicchio (Mathematics and Science)
Luca Raina (History and Geography)
David Wayne Callahan (English Language)
Giovanna Giovannini (Musical Education)
Alessandro Carnevale (Artistic Education)
Daniele Calanna (Physical Education)
Carmelo Trainito (Break Dance)
Marilisa Pino (substitute teacher for Italian and Civic Education)
Carlo Santagostino (Information and Communication Technology)
Max Bruschi (Government School Inspector)

Guardians and Technical Education Teachers

Piero Maggiò (Males)
Lucia Gravante (Females)

Students

Roberta Zacchero (2002, Turin)
Mario Tricca (2004, Castel Madama (RM))
Maggy Gioia (2005, Milan)
Samuele Fazzi (2001, Massa)
Gabriele Montuori (2005, Marcianise (CE))
Giulio Maggio (2004, Montespertoli (FI))
Niccolò Robbiano (2003, Quattordio (AL))
Vilma D'Addario (2004, Potenza)
Mariana Aresta (2003, Bitritto (BA))
Vincenzo Crispino (2003, Naples)
George Ciupilan (2002, Stella (SV))
Gianni Musella (2002, Moncalieri (TO))
Sara Piccione (2003, Dolo (VE))
Martina Brondin (2002, Albignasego (PD))
Francesco Cardamone (2005, Rome)
Asia Busciantella (2004, Trevi (PG))
Chiara Adamuccio (2002, Scorrano (LE))
Claudia Dorelfi (2005, Rome)
Alex Djordjevic (2004, Nerviano (MI))
Andrea Bellantoni (2002, Pomezia (RM))
Alysia Piccamiglio (2003, Soldano (IM))
Benedetta Matera (2005, Naples)

The following students withdrew from the programme:

Benedettagea Matera (First Episode)

The following students were expelled:

Claudia Dorelfi (Fifth Episode) - Claudia was returned to school as a punishment for misbehaving at a field trip. As she had misbehaved several times beforehand, including being suspended and isolated for 48 hours, the headmaster decided that the class assembly had to decide whether she was to remain or leave. The latter option won, 10 votes Vs 7.
Andrea Bellantoni (Fourth Episode) - he organised a fake brawl to avoid participating to a maths lesson. He was excluded from a field trip and later was tested on the week's syllabus, failing which, he was expelled.
Alex Djordjevic (Fourth Episode) - expelled for the same reason as Andrea Bellantoni. 
Alysia Piccamiglio (Second Episode) - she was one of the students forced to resit the entry test after an overnight misbehaviour. Having failed it, she was told to return home.

The following students failed at the final exam:

Francesco Cardamone
Martina Brondin
Asia Busciantella Ricci
Chiara Adamuccio (not admitted to the oral exams).

The following students entered at the third episode:

Andrea Bellantoni
Chiara Adamuccio

The following students failed the entry test:

Alex Djordjevic 
Benedettagea Matera
Samuele Fazzi
George Ciupilan
Sara Piccione

Samuele Fazzi, Alex Djordjevic, George Ciupilan and Sara Piccione were then admitted to the Collegio as, by not participating at the overnight disorder with their classmates, were exempted from a resit exam. Benedettagea Matera withdrew.

The following students caused an overnight fracas. Their admission was revoked and they had to resit the entry test:

Roberta Maria Zacchero
Mario Tricca
Gabriele Montuori
Giulio Maggio
Nicolò Robbiano
Vilma Maria d'Addario
Mariana Aresta
Vincenzo Crispino
Gianni Nunzio Musella
Martina Brondin
Francesco Cardamone
Asia Busciantella Ricci
Claudia Dorelfi
Alysia Piccamiglio

All of the above passed the test and were readmitted, except Alysia Piccamiglio, who had to return home.

Fifth Season - Collegio 1992

Teachers

Paolo Bosisio (Headmaster)
Andrea Maggi (Italian Language and Literature; Civic Education)
Mariarosa Petolicchio (Mathematics and Science)
Luca Raina (History and Geography)
David Wayne Callahan (English Language)
Alessandro Carnevale (Artistic Education)
Valentina Gottlieb (Physical Education)
Patrizio Cigliano (Drama)
Roberta Sette (Sex Education)
Marco Chingari (Singing)
Carlo Santagostino (Information and Communication Technology)

Students
Alessandro Andreini (2004, San Giovanni in Marignano(RN))
Marco Crivellini (2003, Rome)
Bonard Dago (2003, Zero Branco (TV))
Andrea Di Piero (2004, Fiuggi (FR))
Giordano Francati (2003, Rome)
Alessandro Guida (2005, Civitavecchia (RM))
Rahul Teoli (2004, Piombino (LI))
Davide Vavalà (2004, Bologna)
Luca Zigliana (2005, Zanica (BG))
Andrea Prezioso (2002, Locorotondo (BA))
Leonardo Prezioso (2002, Locorotondo (BA))
Usha Teoli (2002, Piombino (LI))
Linda Bertollo (2006, Ivrea (TO))
Sofia Cerio (2004, Pesaro)
Maria Teresa Cristini (2005, Genova)
Ylenia Grambone (2003, Vallo della Lucania (SA))
Giulia Matera (2004, Salerno)
Rebecca Mongelli (2005, Sesto Fiorentino (FI))
Giulia Maria Scarano (2006, Manfredonia (FG))
Luna Lucrezia Scognamiglio (2003, Vietri sul Mare (SA))
Simone Bettin (2003, San Miniato (PI))
Aurora Vanessa Morabito (2003, Savona)
Luca Lapolla (2004, Prato)
Mishel Gashi (2005, Calolziocorte (LC))

The following students were expelled:

Aurora Vanessa Morabito (Third episode) - expelled for continuous misbehaving.

Marco Crivellini (Fourth episode) - expelled for continuous misbehaving.

Simone Bettin (Fourth episode) - expelled for continuous misbehaving.

Rebecca Mongelli (Fourth episode) - she didn’t receive the red jacket because her results were insufficient, so she had to return home.

Ylenia Grambone (Sixth episode) - expelled because she disrespected to the teacher.

Alessandro Andreini (Sixth episode) - expelled because he disrespected to the teacher.

Rahul Teoli (Seventh episode)  - expelled because he raised the hands up on Luca Zigliana.

The following students failed the entry test:

Luca Lapolla

Mishel Gashi

The following students entered in the fourth episode:

Leonardo Prezioso

Andrea Prezioso

The following student failed at the final exam:

Andrea Prezioso

Ratings

References 

Italian television series